Adam Pudil (born 7 April 2005) is a Czech professional footballer who plays as a winger for Slavia Prague.

Club career
Pudil began his career at local teams Tatran Supíkovice and Jeseník, before joining Slavia Prague in 2019. On 10 March 2022, Pudil made his debut for Slavia Prague, in a 4–1 UEFA Europa Conference League win against LASK.

International career
In September 2021, Pudil made his debut for Czech Republic's under-17 side in the Syrenka Cup.

Personal life
Pudil's identical twin, Miloš, also plays for Slavia Prague.

References

2005 births
Living people
People from Jeseník District
Czech footballers
Association football wingers
Czech Republic youth international footballers
SK Slavia Prague players
Sportspeople from the Olomouc Region
Czech twins
Twin sportspeople